was a Japanese serial killer who murdered eight people.

Murders 
Kurita murdered two girlfriends in February 1948. On August 8, 1951, he raped and murdered a 24-year-old woman beside her baby. He then had sex with her corpse.

On October 11, 1951, he raped and murdered a 29-year-old woman. He threw her three children from a cliff called Osen Korogashi. One survived.

Kurita killed a 63-year-old woman and her 24-year-old niece on January 13, 1952. Afterward, he had sex with the niece's dead body. At the crime scene, the police found his fingerprints.

Arrest, trial, and execution 
Kurita was arrested on January 16, 1952.

On August 12, 1952, the district court in Chiba sentenced him to death for the last two murders. The district court in Utsunomiya sentenced him to death for six others on December 21, 1953. He appealed the sentences, but because of mental instability he retracted his appeals on October 21, 1954. He was considered to be neurotic and a danger to himself, committing self-harm but also screaming that he did not want to die. He was executed on October 14, 1959.

Aftermath 
On May 10, 1956, a pro-death penalty prosecutor in Supreme Public Prosecutors Office introduced Kurita into a debate about capital punishment in the Diet.

See also 
Yoshio Kodaira
Capital punishment debate
List of serial killers by country

References 

1926 births
1959 deaths
20th-century executions by Japan
Executed Japanese serial killers
Japanese murderers of children
Japanese people convicted of murder
Japanese rapists
Male serial killers
Necrophiles
People convicted of murder by Japan
People executed by Japan by hanging
People from Akita Prefecture